Dark on Fire is the fourth studio album by the British band Turin Brakes. The band spent 2006 writing and recording demo songs. These songs were tested live on a UK tour in November 2006. After this, Olly Knights and Gale Paridjanian teamed up with their live band and producer Ethan Johns to put the album together. The album was recorded in two different studios in London in early 2007. The band took a break from recording sessions late January because Gale's wife was expecting a baby, but in March 2007 the band finished the recording sessions.

The album was released on 17 September 2007 and entered the UK chart at #36. Special edition copies come with the 5-track bonus EP "Something Out Of Nothing."

The album was released to mostly generally favourable reviews  although some reviewers found the new highly produced full-band sound to be disappointing. Others hailed the album as a return to the quality of 2001's The Optimist LP. Though the album sounds more glossy than previous efforts, it is in fact a mostly live recorded effort. This is significantly different from the previous albums. The band credit Ethan Johns with the idea for this approach. Playing the songs live to an audience helped shaping the songs as well.

Track listing

Singles
 "Stalker" (10 September 2007) – digital download and music video only
 "Something in My Eye" (13 January 2008) – digital download and music video only

Personnel
Rob Allum – drums, background vocals
Phil Marten – keys
Rachel Bolt – viola
Hamish Brown – photography
Alex Cowper – design
Paul Wesley Griggs – photography
Ethan Johns – drums, producer, engineer, string arrangements, mixing
Paul Kegg – cello
Olly Knights – guitar, vocals, string arrangements, photography
Peter Lale – viola
Perry Mason – violin
Eddie Myer – bass, photography
Gale Paridjanian – guitar, ukulele, background vocals, Mellotron, string arrangements, photography
Fergus Peterkin – assistant engineer
Anthony Pleeth – cello
Turin Brakes – performer
Tim Young – mastering
Warren Zielinski – violin

Charts

References

2007 albums
Turin Brakes albums
Albums produced by Ethan Johns